The 1908 Ross by-election was held on 31 January 1908.  The by-election was held due to the death of the incumbent Liberal MP, Alan Coulstoun Gardner.  It was won by the Liberal Unionist candidate and previous MP for Ross Percy Clive.

References

1908 in England
Ross-on-Wye
1908 elections in the United Kingdom
By-elections to the Parliament of the United Kingdom in Herefordshire constituencies
20th century in Herefordshire